John Weldon Niles (February 2, 1876 – August 22, 1961) was a Canadian politician. He served in the Legislative Assembly of New Brunswick as member of the Liberal party from 1925 to 1940.

References

1876 births
1961 deaths
20th-century Canadian politicians
New Brunswick Liberal Association MLAs
People from Woodstock, New Brunswick